Kandyan era frescoes are mural paintings created during the Kingdom of Kandy (1469–1815) in Sri Lanka, a time when kings gave a special place to arts and literature.

As there was a political instability in Sri Lanka after the Anuradhapura Era, which lasted more than 500 years, kings didn't take much effort to build up the religious side of the people. Therefore there were no monks with Upasampada and people didn't have much education about Buddhism. Therefore at the beginning of Kandyan Kingdom, the monks got Upasampada, and started to preach Buddism to people. As people didn't know many things, monks (Specially Sangaraja Maha Nahimi) advised the kings to paint the walls of the temples with Jataka Stories so that anyone could understand even without knowing how to read. This marked the beginning of frescoes of the Kandyan Era.

Special features of Kandyan era frescoes 
The walls of the Kandyan Era were built by clay which was stuck in between sticks. Then after they used Makulu Meti, a white colored clay, to smooth the walls in temples and palaces as it was only allowed for palaces and temples to built in white color at that time. The frescoes were drawn after dividing the wall of the image house into horizontal rows. After dividing, drawing the whole Jataka Story was started from right to left, then left to right in the next row (Zigzag) in Akhanda Kathana Kramaya [akhaṇḍa-kathana-kramaya] or painting the whole story in fresco. To separate different scenes, the artists have drawn a tree, a river, or a house. The pictures of people were drawn in Parshawa Darshi Kramaya [pārśava-darśī-kramaya] , or drawing the faces and legs facing to a side. The background of the frescoes were painted in a dark red color, and flowers like Lotus, Pandanus flowers are used to fill the blanks. These frescoes were drawn in very fine lining.

Flower patterns 
The blanks of the Kandyan Frescoes have been filled with traditional flower patterns. Not only for filling blanks, these patterns have been used to decorate the Udu Viyan (Ceilings). As flowers, mainly lotus flowers are used. Instead of them, Pandanus flowers, Binara flowers, Beraliya flowers, Jasmine flowers have been used.

Paints 
Almost all the paints which were used in Kandyan Frescoes were natural. Those were made up from trees, fruits, etc. mixed together with juices or oils. These were made by artists themselves.

Red color 
Sadilingam, Ixora was mixed to get red color. Red color was also taken from red clay and rocks.

Yellow color 
Yellow was made from mud limestone. Sometimes it was also made from Clusiaciae juice.

Blue color 
Blue color was made from Fabaceae. Sometimes sea sand was heated and mixed with Arrack to make black color.

Green color 
This was made from mixing some blue powder with yellow color.

White color 
White color was always taken by Makulu Meti, a white clay.

Golden color 

Golden was made by mixing limestone and golden limestone in same amounts. Or else it was made by mixing limestone with milk of CLUSIACEAE, mercury, white lead, Seenakkaran, and Salt.

Black color 
Black color was made by mixing charcoal of coconut shells with Dorana Oil.

Brushes 
Brushes was made by the artists themselves. A grass type called Theli was used for this. The hair from the tails of cats and squirrels, hair from downside of deer, horses and stags, beard of cats have been used for this. Even camel hair sometimes. These were tied to a handle and then used. Some popular artists have been offered from golden handles from king.

Plastering 
First, if it is in a cave, then it is roughed and then plastered. This plastering was made by clay and hay. Then a layer of white clay is plastered. Then after clothes were pasted and then started to paint.

Dividing the wall 
The wall was divided into horizontal rows in Kandyan Era Frescoes. A small space was left between two rows to write the story. Sometimes it was written in the fresco in a rectangle. The height of the row varies from 30" to 40" range in low country, while some upcountry temples have range of 5"–6". Then after the fresco was painted.

Themes 
Jataka Stories and Episodes of the Lord Buddha’s Life have been the major themes of Kandyan Frescoes. Other than them, Suvisi Vivarana or Bodhisattva Gautama getting blessings from 24 Previous Buddhas, Bodhisattva Gautama in Thusitha Heaven, first council of Arahaths, Atamasthana (8 famous Buddhist Religious Places), Solosmasthana (16 famous Stupa and Buddhist Religious  Places), Other Bodhisattva, Thousand Buddhas, and History of Sri Lanka and of the Buddhism of Sri Lanka (e.g.: War of Elara and Dutugamunu) have been themed. Actually the religious rise-up made the artists to draw mostly Buddhism Related Frescoes. And those flowers used to fill blanks are Traditional Flower Patterns.

Regional variations 
As the whole country was ruled by the Kingdom of Kandy in early times, this influence of the Kandyan Frescoes was distributed in all over the country. But with the start of Portuguese, Dutch, and British Eras, the European Arts influenced the Kandyan Frescoes. As Portuguese and Dutch only ruled coastal areas, this influence can be seen very largely in coastal areas than upcountry areas. According to these changes Kandyan Frescoes can be divided into two as,
 Up Country Kandyan Era Frescoes
 Low Country Kandyan Era Frescoes

Temples which contain up country Kandyan era frescoes 
 Temple of the Tooth
 Degaldoruwa Temple
 Madawala Tampita Viharaya
 Gangarama Temple – Kandy
 Ridi Temple – Kurunegala
 Suriyagoda Temple
 Theldeniya Bambaragala Viharaya
 Nilagama Thissamaharama Rajamaha Viharaya
 Yapahuwa Rajamaha Viharaya
 Gampola Lankathilaka Viharaya
 Mahanuwara Gangaramaya
 Matale Dambawa Rajamaha Viaharaya
 Dehipagoda Agrabodhi Viharaya
 Makulugaswewa Budugehinna Viharaya
 Kundsale Viharaya
 Isurumuni Rajamaha Viharaya
 Dodanthale Viharaya
are some temples with Up Country Kandyan Era Frescoes. These frescoes are very simple and anyone can easily understand the story. But there are Minor European Influences. For an example, the 'Demons' of the fresco of Mara Parajaya are holding European Guns.

Temples which contain low country Kandyan era frescoes 
 Kathaluwa Viharaya
 Subodharamaya – Karagampitiya, Dehiwala
 Mulkirigala Temple
 Walalgoda Temple
 Samudragiri Temple
 Kadolgalla Subdraramaya
 Pathgama Rahularamaya
 Kosgoda Ganegodalle Viharaya
 Thotagamuwa Subadraramaya
 Welihnida Sudarshanaramaya
 Ambalangoda Sunandaramaya
 Thelwaththe Aluth Pansala
 South Kaluthara Duwe Pansala
 Mihiripanne Ariyakara Viharaya
 Hikkaduwe Jananandaramaya
 Koggala Dewala Building
 North Payagala Ethagama Sumananramaya
 Bambarande Kurumbure Viharaya
 Matara Walgama Kotikagoda Viharaya

These are very complex and a bit hard to understand. Here there are many European influences. For an example, these frescoes contain ladies who wearing frocks and gentlemen who are wearing trousers, Western style houses, etc.

Artists of Kandyan era 
It is believed that there were many artists in Kandyan Era. The variations of the style, not from temple to temple, but sometimes in the same temple. Artists who painted the marvelous Kandyan Frescoes are not much popular. Instead of their names, their clans were popular. The more refined, detailed drawings with fine lines are often the work of the artists of 'Central School'. They received the direct patronage of the king. The simpler, less sophisticated drawings with thicker lines are often work of 'Provincial Schools' maintained by regional leaders and villagers.

Respect and patronage of the kings to an artist at Kandyan era 
An artist was a person who was well respected in the society at Kandyan era. Kings also gave their patronage to artists. There is a folk story about an artist in Kandyan Era."One day, Devaragampola Silvath Thana, the chief artist who worked in Dambulla Renovations was on the scaffolding, painting. Not able to go out to split out wad of betel he was chewing as he worked, he called out his henchman and handed it down to be thrown away. Then that person threw it out and came back, asked from the artist 'How long have you been up there to have chewed such a lot of betel?'. The artist tilted the flame and peered down as the voice was not that of his attending henchman. It was the king..."A Folk Tale from Sri LankaThis story shows how much the king respected artists at that time. So the respect of the society is clear. It is told that the artist is the only person who could ever bear the king's crown in Nethra Mangalya.

Popular artists of the Kandyan era 
 Rev. Mawanelle Devaragampola Silvath Thana
 Rev. Katuwana Thero
 Rev. Waththawe Thero
 Nilagama Patabandi Devendra Mulachari
 Nikawewa Pahalawaththe Ukku Naide
 Kumbepitiye Patabandi Vidanelage Naide
 Wadugama Wijepala Muhandiramlage Neththa Naide
 Deldeniya Hiththara Naide
Hiriyale Naide
 Koswaththe Hiththara Naide
 Ambulpure Muhandiram
 Nilagama Bodhinarayana Chithrachariyage Ukku Naide
 Bodhinarayana Chithracharayage Kapuru Naide
 Patabandige Abharana Appu
 Upasaka Gedara Kirihami
 Delmadu Mulachari
 Gampola Navarathna Patabandi
 Yapahuwe Gannoruwe Muhandiram
 Marukona Rathnabarana
 Rideegama Menik Appu
 Ambakke Deva Surendra Muhandiram
 Kadolgalle Heemappu Maha Siththara
 Devundara Andiris Siththare
 Garanduwe Batuwita Siththare
 Mangalathiriye Siriya Gurunnanse
 Ahangama Dingiri Siththare
 Kiriappu Ganinnanse
 Devundara Punchappu Gurunnanse
 Madiwaka Siththara Naide
 Hathkorale Siththara Muhandiram
 Nuwarakande Serugolle Hiththara Naide

Conservation 
There are no recognizable action has taken to conserve these Kandyan Frescoes other than in the temples where department of archaeology has stepped in. In some temples, photographing these frescoes without permission have been prohibited.

It seems that renovation, new construction and over painting, rather than conservation and preservation were the Sri Lankan Tradition. It still is, expect where Archaeological Department of Sri Lanka has stepped in. The present day paintings at Dambulla Temple, have been done over about 2000 year old frescoes of Anuradhapura Era, in the 18th century. Now only a small piece of Anuradhapura Era Frescoes can be seen. But thanks to the archaeological department, conservation of these frescoes are up to a certain level.

Gallery

See also 

 Kingdom of Kandy
 Fresco
 Department of Archaeology (Sri Lanka)

References

External links 
 https://web.archive.org/web/20161213060032/http://nie.lk/ebook/s10tim118.pdf
 http://nie.lk/ebook/s11tim175.pdf
 http://www.rootsweb.ancestry.com/~lkawgw/sinhalaartists.html

Kingdom of Kandy
Fresco paintings
Sri Lankan art